Audrey Delsanti (born 27 August 1976) is a French astronomer and a discoverer of minor planets at ESO's La Silla Observatory in Chile.

The Minor Planet Center credits her with the discovery of two numbered minor planets, but erroneously gives the credit to "A. Dalsanti" for the trans-Neptunian object , which she co-discovered in 1999.

In 2004 she was awarded a NASA Postdoctoral Fellowship in astrobiology at the Institute for Astronomy of the University of Hawaii in Honolulu.

References

External links 
 Audrey Delsanti – Homepage

21st-century French astronomers
Astrobiologists
Planetary scientists
 
1976 births
Living people
Discoverers of trans-Neptunian objects
French women biologists
Women astronomers
20th-century French women scientists
21st-century French women scientists
Women planetary scientists